Daphnellopsis is a genus of sea snails, marine gastropod mollusks in the family Muricidae.

Species
Species within the genus Daphnellopsis include:
 Daphnellopsis fimbriata (Hinds, 1843)
 Daphnellopsis hypselos Houart, 1995
 Daphnellopsis lamellosa Schepman, 1913
 Daphnellopsis lochi Houart, 2013
 † Daphnellopsis lozoueti Houart, 2013 
 † Daphnellopsis pinedai Houart, 2013 
Species brought into synonymy 
 Daphnellopsis murex Hedley, 1922: synonym of Lindapterys murex (Hedley, 1922)

References

 Houart R. (2013) The genus Daphnellopsis (Gastropoda: Muricidae) in the Recent and Quaternary of the Indo-West Pacific province. Journal of Conchology 41(4): 465-480.

External links
 Schepman M.M. (1913) The Prosobranchia of the Siboga Expedition. Part V. Toxoglossa, with a supplement. Siboga-Expeditie, 49e: 365-452, pls. 25-34. Leiden, E.J. Brill

 
Gastropod genera